This is a list of the fastest animals in the world, by types of animal.

Fastest organism
The fastest land animal is the cheetah. Among the fastest animals in the sea is the black marlin, with uncertain and conflicting reports of recorded speeds.

When drawing comparisons between different classes of animals, an alternative unit is sometimes used for organisms: body length per second. On this basis the 'fastest' organism on earth, relative to its body length, is the Southern Californian mite, Paratarsotomus macropalpis, which has a speed of 322 body lengths per second. The equivalent speed for a human, running as fast as this mite, would be . The cheetah, the fastest land mammal, scores at only 16 body lengths per second, while Anna's hummingbird has the highest known length-specific velocity attained by any vertebrate.  [However 'body length per second' is a theoretically dubious unit which cannot be justified by engineering/physics dimensional analysis, it implies for example that a 2m long shark should be able to swim 10 times as fast as it could when it was a 20 cm long juvenile, and that a large bird three times as long as a small bird of similar type and shape ought be able to fly three times faster than the small bird, neither being what hydrodynamic/aerodynamic analysis would predict or what happens in nature].

Invertebrates

Fish
Due to physical constraints, fish may be incapable of exceeding swim speeds of 36 km/h (22 mph). Larger reported figures are therefore highly questionable.

Amphibians

Reptiles

Birds

Mammals

See also
 Speed records

Notes

References

Lists of animals
Fastest
Biological records